Miner Wars Arena is an action video game developed by Keen Software House. It is a spin-off to Miner Wars 2081. The game is inspired by Tunnelers. The game is set in 2090 when the Solar System underwent a political breakdown and humanity is fighting for resources on asteroids.

Gameplay 
The gameplay is very similar to Tunnelers. The player controls a mining ship and his goal is to defeat his enemies in a bed-rock covered arena. There are multiple game modes. In skirmish, players set up custom battles. Tournament mode consists of 15 levels. In every level, the player has a different weapon and ship. There is also a split-screen multiplayer mode which is limited to 2 AI opponents. The special edition also contains a "protect the generator" mode.

Players can choose from 3 different ships and 5 types of weapons. There are also 10 possible upgrades and power-ups. Player can also rank up to 12 military ranks.

References

External links 
Official site

2012 video games
Indie video games
Science fiction video games
Video games developed in the Czech Republic
Windows games
MacOS games